Karen Lavinia Pugh (born 1965), is a female former athlete who competed for England.

Athletics career
Pugh represented England and won a bronze medal in the discus event, at the 1986 Commonwealth Games in Edinburgh, Scotland.

She was twice a silver medal winner and four times a bronze medal winner at the National AAA Championships.

References

1965 births
Living people
Athletes (track and field) at the 1978 Commonwealth Games
British female discus throwers
English female discus throwers
Commonwealth Games medallists in athletics
Commonwealth Games bronze medallists for England
Medallists at the 1986 Commonwealth Games